The 2013 Sun Belt Conference football season was the 13th college football season for the Sun Belt Conference. During the 2013 season, Sun Belt football consisted of eight members: Arkansas State, Georgia State, Louisiana–Lafayette, Louisiana–Monroe, South Alabama, Texas State, Troy, and Western Kentucky.

This was the first season for two teams in Sun Belt football; and the final season of Sun Belt play for a third. Georgia State was one of the six charter members of the Sun Belt Conference in 1976, but left the league in 1981, 20 years before the conference began sponsoring football in 2001 and nearly 30 years before the school started its football program in 2010. The Panthers returned to the Sun Belt in 2013 during a major wave of realignment that dramatically affected the conference. Also joining the Sun Belt in 2013 was Texas State, which left the WAC after only one season in that league. WKU was in its last season of Sun Belt play, as it will join Conference USA in 2014.

Due to NCAA transitional rules, Georgia State, coming from the FCS Colonial Athletic Association, was not eligible for a conference championship or postseason play. South Alabama and Texas State, which both began transitions from FCS in 2011, were now eligible for postseason play and a conference championship.

Preseason

Award watch lists
The following Sun Belt players were named to preseason award watch lists:

Walter Camp Award:
 Antonio Andrews – WKU
 Kolton Browning – Louisiana-Monroe

Doak Walker Award:
 Antonio Andrews – WKU
 David Oku – Arkansas State

Davey O'Brien Award:
 Kolton Browning – Louisiana-Monroe
 Terrance Broadway – Louisiana–Lafayette

Outland Trophy:
 Ryan Carrethers – Arkansas State

Bronko Nagurski Trophy:
 Andrew Jackson – Western Kentucky

Lou Groza Award:
 Brian Davis – Arkansas State
 Will Scott – Troy

Rimington Trophy:
 Andre Huval – Louisiana-Lafayette
 Bryce Giddens – Arkansas State
 Sean Conway – WKU

Bednarik Award:
 Ryan Carrethers – Arkansas State
 Andrew Jackson – WKU

Paul Hornung Award:
 Antonio Andrews – WKU

Sun Belt Media Day
Sun Belt Conference Media Days was held on July 15, 2013 in the Mercedes-Benz Superdome in New Orleans, Louisiana.
Pre-Season Offensive Player of the Year - Kolton Browning (QB, Louisiana-Monroe)
Pre-Season Defensive Player of the Year - Andrew Jackson (LB, WKU)

Coaches Poll
 Louisiana-Lafayette - 57 (4)
 Louisiana-Monroe - 57 (2)
 Arkansas State - 45 (2)
 WKU - 44
 Troy - 35
 Texas State - 23
 South Alabama - 19
 Georgia State -8

Louisiana-Lafayette & ULM tied for conference pre-season champions. Louisiana-Lafayette is listed as #1 because of 1st place votes.

Preseason All–Conference Team

Offense
QB Kolton Browning (Louisiana-Monroe)
RB David Oku (Arkansas State)
RB Antonio Andrews (WKU)
WR J. D. McKissic (Arkansas State)
WR Je’Ron Hamm (Louisiana-Monroe)
WR Eric Thomas (Troy)
TE Wes Saxton (South Alabama)
OL Bryce Giddens (Arkansas State)
OL Andre Huval (Louisiana-Lafayette)
OL Josh Allen (Louisiana-Monroe)
OL Terrence Jones (Troy)
OL Sean Conway (WKU)

Defense
DL Ryan Carrethers (Arkansas State)
DL Christian Ringo (Louisiana-Lafayette)
DL Kentarius Caldwell (Louisiana-Monroe)
DL Alex Page (South Alabama)
LB Qushaun Lee (Arkansas State)
LB Justin Anderson (Louisiana-Lafayette)
LB Andrew Jackson (WKU)
DB Sterling Young (Arkansas State)
DB Isaiah Newsome (Louisiana-Monroe)
DB Tyrell Pearson (South Alabama)
DB Jonathan Dowling (WKU)

Specialists
K Brian Davis (Arkansas State) 
P Will Scott (Troy) 
RS Antonio Andrews (WKU)

Coaches
NOTE: Stats shown are before the beginning of the season

Sun Belt vs. BCS AQ Conference matchups

Regular season

All dates, times, and TV are tentative and subject to change.

All Sun Belt teams are located in the Central Time Zone except for Georgia State, which is in the Eastern Time Zone. Start times for non-conference games are local for the Sun Belt team; for conference games, starting times are local for the home team.

Rankings reflect that of the USA Today Coaches poll for that week until week eight when the BCS poll will be used.

Week 1

Players of the Week

Week 2

Players of the Week

Week 3

Open this week: Texas State
Players of the Week

Week 4

Open this week: South Alabama

Players of the Week

Week 5

Open this week: Georgia State, Louisiana-Lafayette

Players of the Week

Week 6

Open this week: Arkansas State

Players of the Week

Week 7

Open this week: South Alabama, Louisiana-Lafayette, Western Kentucky

Players of the Week

Week 8

Open this week: Arkansas State, Troy, Louisiana-Monroe

Players of the Week

Week 9

Players of the Week

Week 10

Players of the Week

Week 11

Open this week: Georgia State, South Alabama, Texas State

Players of the Week

Week 12

Open this week: Louisiana-Monroe, Western Kentucky

Players of the Week

Week 13

Open this week : Troy, Louisiana-Lafayette

Players of the Week

Week 14

Players of the Week

Week 15

Players of the Week

Bowl games
In 2013, the SBC placed 2 teams in bowl games, while 5 other teams were bowl-eligible but not selected for bowl games. The conference went 2-0 with Arkansas State and Louisiana-Lafayette both winning.

NOTE: All times are local

Players of the Year
2013 Sun Belt Player of the Year awards

All-Sun Belt/American Team
Coaches All-Conference Selections

Honorable Mention: Arkansas State: Adam Kennedy, Chris Stone; Georgia State: Ulrick John, Joseph Peterson; Louisiana-Lafayette: Jacob Maxwell, Dominique Tovell; Louisiana-Monroe: Kolton Browning, Centarius Donald;  South Alabama Jay Jones, Aleem Sunanon ; Texas State: David Mayo, Mike Orakpo; Troy: Jordan Chunn, Bryan Holmes; Western Kentucky: Willie McNeal, Forrest Lamp.

All-Americans
Western Kentucky's Antonio Andrews was named 1st team All-American by SI for All-Purpose team.

Home attendance

†Western Kentucky played first game at LP Field in Nashville, Tennessee vs. Kentucky (Counted as home game). Total attendance, average attendance and percent of capacity figure calculated based only on games in L.T. Smith Stadium

References